Events during the year 2002 in Northern Ireland.

Incumbents
 First Minister - David Trimble (until 14 October)
 deputy First Minister - Mark Durkan (until 14 October)
 Secretary of State - John Reid (until October 24), Paul Murphy (from October 24)

Events
9 January – Holy Cross dispute: Confrontations outside Holy Cross Primary School, a Roman Catholic girls' school in the largely Protestant Ardoyne district, during the afternoon school run, explode into widespread sectarian rioting which spreads across north Belfast and continues on 10 January, when the school is closed.
14 February – Kilkeel fishing boat The Tullaghmurray Lass is lost with all three crew in the Irish Sea.
February – West Belfast Task Force recommends creation of the Gaeltacht Quarter, Belfast.
14 March – Lisburn and Newry are granted city status.
5 April – The first recruits of the new Police Service of Northern Ireland graduate.
May – May 2002 Belfast riots
31 May to 3 June – 2002 Short Strand clashes
4 October – "Stormontgate": Denis Donaldson, Sinn Féin’s Northern Ireland Assembly group administrator, and two others are arrested for intelligence-gathering.
14 October – The Northern Ireland Assembly and the Executive are suspended by order of the Secretary of State.
Work is completed on the renovation of the Albert Memorial Clock, Belfast.

Arts and literature
David Park's novel The Big Snow is published.
Richard Dormer's one-man play Hurricane (based on the life of snooker player Alex Higgins) opens at the Old Museum Arts Centre, Belfast.

Sport

Football
Irish League
Winners: Portadown

Irish Cup
Winners: Linfield 2 – 1 Portadown

FAI Cup
Winners: Derry City 1 – 0 Shamrock Rovers

Gaelic Athletic Association

Ulster Senior Football Championship Final
Armagh 1–14 – 1–10 Donegal
All-Ireland Senior Football Championship Final
Armagh 1–12 – 0–14 Kerry

Golf
Senior British Open Championship held at Royal County Down Golf Club, (winner: Noboru Sugai).
Graeme McDowell turns professional and wins that season's Volvo Scandinavian Masters.

Ice Hockey
Belfast Giants win the Ice Hockey Superleague championship.

Deaths
8 January – David McWilliams, singer, songwriter and guitarist (born 1945).
26 February – Helen Megaw, crystallographer (born 1907).
19 March – David Beers Quinn, historian (born 1909).
13 April – Desmond Titterington, racing driver (born 1928).
17 May – James Chichester-Clark, Fifth Prime Minister of Northern Ireland (born 1923).
28 August – Jim McFadden, ice hockey player (born 1920).
3 October – John Erritt, Deputy Director of the British Government Statistical Service (born 1931).
17 October - Derek Bell, harpist and composer (born 1935).

See also
2002 in England
2002 in Scotland
2002 in Wales

References

 
Northern Ireland
Northern Ireland
Northern Ireland